Ferdinand Fabra (8 October 1906 – 22 December 2007) was a German football manager.

He coached the Finland national team from 1936 to 1937 and was the team's manager at the 1936 Summer Olympics in Berlin. During Fabra's period Finland played eight games with one victory, one draw and six losses.

References 

1906 births
2007 deaths
People from Geseke
Sportspeople from Arnsberg (region)
People from the Province of Westphalia
German football managers
Eintracht Braunschweig managers
Borussia Dortmund managers
Finland national football team managers
SpVgg Greuther Fürth managers
Wuppertaler SV managers
German centenarians
Men centenarians
Borussia Neunkirchen managers